Viktor Ivanovich Ageev (29 April 1936 – 30 January 2023) was a Soviet water polo player who competed for the Soviet Union in the 1956 Summer Olympics, in the 1960 Summer Olympics, and in the 1964 Summer Olympics.

Biography 
Ageyev was born in Moscow on 29 April 1936. He died on 30 January 2023, at the age of 86.

Career 
In 1956 he was a member of the Soviet team which won the bronze medal. He played two matches.

Four years later he won the silver medal with the Soviet team in the water polo competition at the 1960 Games. He played two matches again.

At the 1964 Games he was part of the Soviet team which won again a bronze medal in the Olympic water polo tournament. He played all six matches and scored two goals.

See also 
 Soviet Union men's Olympic water polo team records and statistics
 List of Olympic medalists in water polo (men)

References

External links
 

1936 births
2023 deaths
Soviet male water polo players
Olympic water polo players of the Soviet Union
Water polo players at the 1956 Summer Olympics
Water polo players at the 1960 Summer Olympics
Water polo players at the 1964 Summer Olympics
Olympic silver medalists for the Soviet Union
Olympic bronze medalists for the Soviet Union
Olympic medalists in water polo
Sportspeople from Moscow
Medalists at the 1964 Summer Olympics
Medalists at the 1960 Summer Olympics
Medalists at the 1956 Summer Olympics